Sason is a district in the Batman Province of Turkey

Sason may also refer to:

Sason (spider), genus of spiders
Sason (Σάσων), ancient Greek name of Sazan Island, Albania
Aaron Sason:
Aaron ben Isaac Sason, Jewish Ottoman author and Talmudist
Aaron ben Joseph Sason, Jewish Ottoman author and Talmudist
Joshua Sason, American entrepreneur, investor, and entertainment producer

See also

Anani ben Sason